RCFC may refer to:

 R. Cappellen F.C.
 Resources Capital FC
 Ross County F.C.
 Rothwell Corinthians F.C.